Toonpur Ka Superrhero ( Toonpur's Superhero) is a 2010 Indian live-action animated action comedy film written by Raagii Bhatnagar and directed by Kireet Khurana. The film features Ajay Devgn, Kajol, Sanjay Mishra, Tanuja and Mukesh Tiwari in lead roles. The film was India's first live action - 3D animation combination feature film.

Plot

The story is based on Aditya Kumar (Ajay Devgn), a famous actor who plays a very famous superhero on TV and acts in films as well. He lives in a nice village of sorts with his family , which consists of his wife, Priya (Kajol), and two children; Kabir and Raima. He frequently tries to explain to his son that all cartoons are fake and that he shouldn't waste his time watching them. Kabir gets irritated, and one night tells him that he is a "fake" hero too, for his stunts are performed by doubles. Feeling humiliated, he leaves home, and is soon kidnapped by the cartoons his son watches. They kidnap him for they overhear two people talking and saying that Aditya is a famous hero. This kidnapping is done through a series of underground mazes, tunnels and sewers. On waking up, he finds himself in an animated world. A group of cartoons greet him, identifying themselves as "Devtoons" i.e. the good cartoons. They try to convince Aditya to fight Jagaro, a powerful villain, to protect their existence and save their King. This is followed by a song, "Jeetoge Tum".

Aditya initially hesitates, but when a character from Toonpur named Bolly says he is a fake hero, he feels humiliated, but then agrees to fight , so that he can prove that he is a real superhero to everyone, and particularly his son. Aditya and his cartoon friends attack Jagaro's base, defeat the "Toonasurs" i.e. the evil cartoons and save the King, Tooneshwar, but in the process, many of their friends get kidnapped by Jagaro. Now the only option left for Aditya, is to get the "Toonastra", a pencil-and-eraser-shaped overpowered weapon from Rubdoot(The supposed God of Destruction in Toonpur) and erase Jagaro from existence using its tremendous strength. He goes to meet Rubdoot, where it is discovered that Rubdoot is a hardcore fan of Aditya as a superhero. Aditya manages to get the Toonastra, however, Rubdoot warns him saying that he can use this weapon only once; the reason being that this weapon needs constant charging, and Rubdoot himself is the charger. Aditya leaves, promising Rubdoot that if the weapon worked, he would make Rubdoot his best friend. This makes Rubdoot emotional, who promises to wait as well.

However, Jagaro gets to know of the plan concocted by the Devtoons and kidnaps Aditya's family to prevent his own demise. However, Aditya challenges Jagaro to a game- a final fight. Jagaro agrees, and the game starts at his gaming club. Aditya manages to complete the first level, which is wild-west themed, by rescuing Priya from the Toonasurs and destroying them. In the second round, Priya plays a pivotal role in crossing the traps successfully and saving Raima and the Devtoons by her ingenuity. Jagaro uses many methods of cunning and deceit throughout the rounds to prevent Aditya's victory. The third round is the final duel between Aditya and Jagaro, which Aditya manages to win after a long struggle. Afterwards, Kabir finally accepts his father as a real hero, which finally makes Aditya happy. Rubdoot is given Aditya's autograph and becomes his best-friend. The end of the movie shows Aditya leaving the Devtoons in peace, and Toonpur in a joyous celebration.

Cast

Ajay Devgn as Aditya Kumar
Kajol as Priya Kumar (Née Verma), Aditya's wife
Tanuja as Shruti Verma, Priya's mother 
Amey Pandya as Kabir Kumar, Aditya's Son
Sanjay Mishra as Shyam
Delnaaz Paul as Ramola/ reporter in Ajay Devgan introduction scene
Mukesh Tiwari as Inspector Kitkite
Raza Murad
Chinky Jaiswal as Raima Kumar, Aditya’s daughter 
Sanjay Dutt as Narrator
Deepak Verma as Bolly

Soundtrack
The film's music was composed by Anu Malik, with lyrics by Mumzy, and was released on 10 December 2010.

Critical reception
The Times of India rated the film 3 out of 5, praising the performances and storyline. Kaveree Bamzai from India Today rated the film 1 out of 5, terming the film as "Toonathon that's an exercise in torture". Sukanya Verma from Rediff.com rated the film 2.5 out of 5.

Sudhish Kamath from The Hindu criticised the film with no ratings. Mayank Shekhar from Hindustan Times rated the film 2 out of 5.

See also
Indian animation industry

References

External links 
 
 

2010 films
2010s Hindi-language films
2010 3D films
Indian 3D films
Indian animated films
Indian action adventure films
Films scored by Rishi Rich
Indian adventure comedy films
Indian films with live action and animation
Films scored by Anu Malik
Indian action comedy films
Indian fantasy comedy films
2010s children's fantasy films
2010s action adventure films
2010s adventure comedy films
2010 action comedy films
2010s fantasy comedy films
2010 comedy films
Indian animated fantasy films
Indian animated speculative fiction films